Casablanca, also known in Arabic as Dar al-Bayda (: "White House") is the largest city in Morocco and the country's economic and business center. Located on the Atlantic coast of the Chaouia plain in the central-western part of Morocco, the city has a population of about 3.71 million in the urban area, and over 4.27 million in the Greater Casablanca, making it the most populous city in the Maghreb region, and the eighth-largest in the Arab world.

Casablanca is Morocco's chief port, with the Port of Casablanca being one of the largest artificial ports in the world, and the second largest port in North Africa, after Tanger-Med ( east of Tangier). Casablanca also hosts the primary naval base for the Royal Moroccan Navy.

Casablanca is considered a Global Financial Centre, ranking 54th globally in the Global Financial Centres Index rankings for the year 2022, outperforming many cities such as New Delhi, Jakarta, Istanbul, and Mexico City. Casablanca is ranked among the Emerging International contenders, and it is considered the largest financial center in Africa. The leading Moroccan companies and many of the larger American and European corporations doing business in the country have their headquarters and main industrial facilities in Casablanca. Recent industrial statistics show Casablanca is the primary industrial zone of the nation.

Etymology

Anfa 
Before the 15th century, the settlement at what is now Casablanca had been called Anfa, rendered in European sources variously as El-Anfa, Anafa or Anaffa, Anafe, Anife, Anafee, Nafe, and Nafee. Ibn Khaldun ascribed the name to the Anfaça, a branch of the  tribe of the Maghreb, though the sociologist André Adam refuted this claim due to the absence of the third syllable. Nahum Slouschz gave a Hebrew etymology, citing the Lexicon of Gesenius: anâphâh (a type of bird) or anaph (face, figure), though Adam refuted this arguing that even a Judaized population would still have spoken Tamazight. Adam also refuted an Arabic etymology,  (anf, "nose"), as the city predated the linguistic Arabization of the country, and the term anf was not used to describe geographic areas. Adam affirmed a Tamazight etymology—from anfa "hill," anfa "promontory on the sea," ifni "sandy beach," or anfa "threshing floor"—although he determined the available information insufficient to establish exactly which. The name Anfa is now rendered in Neo-Tifinagh as ⴰⵏⴼⴰ.

The name "Anfa" was used in maps until around 1830—in some until 1851—which Adam attributes to the tendency of cartographers to replicate previous maps.

Casablanca 

When Sultan Mohammed ben Abdallah (–1790) rebuilt the city after its destruction in the earthquake of 1755, it was renamed "ad-Dār al-Bayḍāʾ " ( The White House), though in vernacular use it was pronounced "Dar al-Baiḍā" ( literally House of the White, although in Moroccan Arabic vernacular it retains the original sense of The White House).

The origins of the name "Casablanca" are unclear, although several theories have been suggested. André Adam mentions the legend of the Sufi saint and merchant Allal al-Qairawani, who supposedly came from Tunisia and settled in Casablanca with his wife Lalla al-Baiḍāʾ ( White Lady). The villagers of Mediouna would reportedly provision themselves at "Dar al-Baiḍāʾ" ( House of the White).

In fact, on a low hill slightly inland above the ruins of Anfa and just to the west of today's city centre, it appears there was a white-washed structure, possibly a Sufi zawiya that acted as a landmark to sailors. The Portuguese cartographer Duarte Pacheco wrote in the early 16th century that the city could easily be identified by a tower, and nautical guides from the late 19th century still mentioned a "white tower" as a point of reference. The Portuguese mariners calqued the modern Arabic name to "Casa Branca" ( White House) in place of Anfa. The name "Casablanca" was then a calque of the Portuguese name when the Spanish took over trade through the Iberian Union.

During the French protectorate in Morocco, the name remained Casablanca.

History

Early history 
The area which is today Casablanca was founded and settled by Berbers by at least the seventh century BC. It was used as a port by the Phoenicians and later the Romans. In his book Description of Africa, Leo Africanus refers to ancient Casablanca as "Anfa", a great city founded in the Berber kingdom of Barghawata in 744 AD. He believed Anfa was the most "prosperous city on the Atlantic Coast because of its fertile land." Barghawata rose as an independent state around this time, and continued until it was conquered by the Almoravids in 1068. Following the defeat of the Barghawata in the 12th century, Arab tribes of Hilal and Sulaym descent settled in the region, mixing with the local Berbers, which led to widespread Arabization. During the 14th century, under the Merinids, Anfa rose in importance as a port. The last of the Merinids were ousted by a popular revolt in 1465.

Portuguese conquest and Spanish influence 

In the early 15th century, the town became an independent state once again, and emerged as a safe harbour for pirates and privateers, leading to it being targeted by the Portuguese, who bombarded the town which led to its destruction in 1468. The Portuguese used the ruins of Anfa to build a military fortress in 1515. The town that grew up around it was called Casa Branca, meaning "white house" in Portuguese.

Between 1580 and 1640, the Crown of Portugal was integrated into the Crown of Spain, so Casablanca and all other areas occupied by the Portuguese were under Spanish control, though maintaining an autonomous Portuguese administration. As Portugal broke ties with Spain in 1640, Casablanca came under full Portuguese control once again. The Europeans eventually abandoned the area completely in 1755 following an earthquake which destroyed most of the town.

The town was finally reconstructed between 1756 and 1790 by Sultan Mohammed ben Abdallah, the grandson of Moulay Ismail and an ally of George Washington, with the help of Spaniards from the nearby emporium. The town was called ad-Dār al-Bayḍāʼ (الدار البيضاء), the Arabic translation of the Portuguese Casa Branca.

Colonial struggle 

In the 19th century, the area's population began to grow as it became a major supplier of wool to the booming textile industry in Britain and shipping traffic increased (the British, in return, began importing gunpowder tea, used in Morocco's national drink, mint tea). By the 1860s, around 5,000 residents were there, and the population grew to around 10,000 by the late 1880s. Casablanca remained a modestly sized port, with a population reaching around 12,000 within a few years of the French conquest and arrival of French colonialists in 1906. By 1921, this rose to 110,000, largely through the development of shanty towns.

Bombardment of Casablanca 
The Treaty of Algeciras of 1906 formalized French preeminence in Morocco and included three measures that directly impacted Casablanca: that French officers would control operations at the customs office and seize revenue as collateral for loans given by France, that the French holding company La Compagnie Marocaine would develop the port of Casablanca, and that a French-and-Spanish-trained police force would be assembled to patrol the port.

To build the port's breakwater, narrow-gauge track was laid in June 1907 for a small Decauville locomotive to connect the port to a quarry in Roches Noires, passing through the sacred Sidi Belyout graveyard. In resistance to this and the measures of the 1906 Treaty of Algeciras, tribesmen of the Chaouia attacked the locomotive, killing 9 Compagnie Marocaine laborers—3 French, 3 Italians, and 3 Spanish.

In response, the French bombarded the city in August 1907 with multiple gunboats and landed troops inside the town, causing severe damage and killing between 600 and 3,000 Moroccans. Estimates for the total casualties are as high as 15,000 dead and wounded. In the immediate aftermath of the bombardment and the deployment of French troops, the European homes and the Mellah, or Jewish quarter, were sacked, and the latter was also set ablaze.

As Oujda had already been occupied, the bombardment and military invasion of the city opened a western front to the French military conquest of Morocco.

French rule and influence 

French control of Casablanca was formalized March 1912 when the Treaty of Fes established the French Protectorat. Under French imperial control, Casablanca became a port of colonial extraction.

General Hubert Lyautey assigned the planning of the new colonial port city to Henri Prost. As he did in other Moroccan cities, Prost designed a European ville nouvelle outside the walls of the medina. In Casablanca, he also designed a new "ville indigène" to house Moroccans arriving from other cities.

Europeans formed almost half the population of Casablanca.

A 1937-1938 typhoid fever outbreak was exploited by colonial authorities to justify the appropriation of urban spaces in Casablanca.

World War II 

After Philippe Pétain of France signed the armistice with the Nazis, he ordered French troops in France's colonial empire to defend French territory against any aggressors—Allied or otherwise—applying a policy of "asymmetrical neutrality" in favour of the Germans. French colonists in Morocco generally supported Pétain, while politically conscious Moroccans tended to favour de Gaulle and the Allies.

Operation Torch, which started on 8 November 1942, was the British-American invasion of French North Africa during the North African campaign of World War II. The Western Task Force, composed of American units led by Major General George S. Patton and Rear Admiral Henry Kent Hewitt, carried out the invasions of Mehdia, Fedhala, and Asfi. American forces captured Casablanca from Vichy control when France surrendered 11 November 1942, but the Naval Battle of Casablanca continued until American forces sank German submarine U-173 on 16 November.

Casablanca was the site of the Nouasseur Air Base, a large American air base used as the staging area for all American aircraft for the European Theatre of Operations during World War II. The airfield has since become Mohammed V International Airport.

Anfa Conference 

Casablanca hosted the Anfa Conference (also called the Casablanca Conference) in January 1943. Prime Minister Winston Churchill and President Franklin D. Roosevelt discussed the progress of the war. Also in attendance were the Free France generals Charles de Gaulle and Henri Giraud, though they played minor roles and didn't participate in the military planning.

It was at this conference that the Allies adopted the doctrine of "unconditional surrender," meaning that the Axis powers would be fought until their defeat. Roosevelt also met privately with Sultan Muhammad V and expressed his support for Moroccan independence after the war. This became a turning point, as Moroccan nationalists were emboldened to openly seek complete independence.

Toward independence 
During the 1940s and 1950s, Casablanca was a major centre of anti-French rioting.

7 April 1947, a massacre of working class Moroccans, carried out by Senegalese Tirailleurs in the service of the French colonial army, was instigated just as Sultan Muhammed V was due to make a speech in Tangier appealing for independence.

Riots in Casablanca took place from 7–8 December 1952, in response to the assassination of the Tunisian labor unionist Farhat Hached by La Main Rouge—the clandestine militant wing of French intelligence. Then, on 25 December 1953 (Christmas Day), Muhammad Zarqtuni orchestrated a bombing of Casablanca's Central Market in response to the forced exile of Sultan Muhammad V and the royal family on 20 August (Eid al-Adha) of that year.

Since independence 
Morocco gained independence from France in 1956.

Casablanca Group 
 4–7 January 1961, the city hosted an ensemble of progressive African leaders during the Casablanca Conference of 1961. Among those received by King Muhammad V were Gamal Abd An-Nasser, Kwame Nkrumah, Modibo Keïta, and Ahmed Sékou Touré, Ferhat Abbas.

Jewish emigration 
Casablanca was a major departure point for Jews leaving Morocco through Operation Yachin, an operation conducted by Mossad to secretly migrate Moroccan Jews to Israel between November 1961 and spring 1964.

1965 riots 
The 1965 student protests organized by the National Union of Popular Forces-affiliated National Union of Moroccan Students, which spread to cities around the country and devolved into riots, started on 22 March 1965, in front of Lycée Mohammed V in Casablanca. The protests started as a peaceful march to demand the right to public higher education for Morocco, but expanded to include concerns of labourers, the unemployed, and other marginalized segments of society, and devolved into vandalism and rioting. The riots were violently repressed by security forces with tanks and armoured vehicles; Moroccan authorities reported a dozen deaths while the UNFP reported more than 1,000.

King Hassan II blamed the events on teachers and parents, and declared in a speech to the nation on 30 March 1965: "There is no greater danger to the State than a so-called intellectual. It would have been better if you were all illiterate."

1981 riots 
On 6 June 1981, the Casablanca Bread Riots took place. Hassan II appointed the French-trained interior minister Driss Basri as hardliner, who would later become a symbol of the Years of Lead, with quelling the protests. The government stated that 66 people were killed and 100 were injured, while opposition leaders put the number of dead at 637, saying that many of these were killed by police and army gunfire.

Mudawana 
In March 2000, more than 60 women's groups organized demonstrations in Casablanca proposing reforms to the legal status of women in the country. About 40,000 women attended, calling for a ban on polygamy and the introduction of divorce law (divorce being a purely religious procedure at that time). Although the counter-demonstration attracted half a million participants, the movement for change started in 2000 was influential on King Mohammed VI, and he enacted a new mudawana, or family law, in early 2004, meeting some of the demands of women's rights activists.

Further history
On 16 May 2003, 33 civilians were killed and more than 100 people were injured when Casablanca was hit by a multiple suicide bomb attack carried out by Moroccans and claimed by some to have been linked to al-Qaeda. Twelve suicide bombers struck five locations in the city.

Another series of suicide bombings struck the city in early 2007. These events illustrated some of the persistent challenges the city faces in addressing poverty and integrating disadvantaged neighborhoods and populations. One initiative to improve conditions in the city's disadvantaged neighborhoods was the creation of the Sidi Moumen Cultural Center.

As calls for reform spread through the Arab world in 2011, Moroccans joined in, but concessions by the ruler led to acceptance. However, in December, thousands of people demonstrated in several parts of the city, especially the city center near la Fontaine, desiring more significant political reforms.

Geography 

Casablanca is located on the Atlantic coast of the Chaouia Plains, which have historically been the breadbasket of Morocco. Apart from the Atlantic coast, the Bouskoura forest is the only natural attraction in the city. The forest was planted in the 20th century and consists mostly of eucalyptus, palm, and pine trees. It is located halfway to the city's international airport.

The only watercourse in Casablanca is oued Bouskoura, a small seasonal creek that until 1912 reached the Atlantic Ocean near the actual port. Most of oued Bouskoura's bed has been covered due to urbanization and only the part south of El Jadida road can now be seen. The closest permanent river to Casablanca is Oum Rabia,  to the south-east.

Climate 

Casablanca has a hot-summer Mediterranean climate (Köppen climate classification Csa). The cool Canary Current off the Atlantic coast moderates temperature variation, which results in a climate remarkably similar to that of coastal Los Angeles, with similar temperature ranges.

Climate change 
A 2019 paper published in PLOS One estimated that under Representative Concentration Pathway 4.5, a "moderate" scenario of climate change where global warming reaches ~ by 2100, the climate of Casablanca in the year 2050 would most closely resemble the current climate of Tripoli, Libya.

Moreover, according to the 2022 IPCC Sixth Assessment Report, Casablanca is one of 12 major African cities (Abidjan, Alexandria, Algiers, Cape Town, Casablanca, Dakar, Dar es Salaam, Durban, Lagos, Lomé, Luanda and Maputo) which would be the most severely affected by future sea level rise. It estimates that they would collectively sustain cumulative damages of USD 65 billion under RCP 4.5 and USD 86.5 billion for the high-emission scenario RCP 8.5 by the year 2050. Additionally, RCP 8.5 combined with the hypothetical impact from marine ice sheet instability at high levels of warming would involve up to 137.5 billion USD in damages, while the additional accounting for the "low-probability, high-damage events" may increase aggregate risks to USD 187 billion for the "moderate" RCP4.5, USD 206 billion for RCP8.5 and USD 397 billion under the high-end ice sheet instability scenario. Since sea level rise would continue for about 10,000 years under every scenario of climate change, future costs of sea level rise would only increase, especially without adaptation measures.

Economy 

The Grand Casablanca region is considered the locomotive of the development of the Moroccan economy. It attracts 32% of the country's production units and 56% of industrial labor. The region uses 30% of the national electricity production. With MAD 93 billion, the region contributes to 44% of the industrial production of the kingdom. About 33% of national industrial exports, MAD 27 billion, comes from the Grand Casablanca; 30% of the Moroccan banking network is concentrated in Casablanca.

Casablanca is considered a global financial centre, ranking 53rd globally in the Global Financial Centres Index for the year 2021, outperforming many cities such as Mumbai, New Delhi, Berlin, Istanbul, Mexico City, Glasgow, Jakarta, Rio de Janeiro, São Paulo, Riyadh, Doha, Kuwait City, Cape Town, and Johannesburg. Casablanca is ranked among the emerging international contenders, and it is the largest financial center in Africa.

One of the most important Casablancan exports is phosphate. Other industries include fishing, fish canning, sawmills, furniture production, building materials, glass, textiles, electronics, leather work, processed food, spirits, soft drinks, and cigarettes.

The Casablanca and Mohammedia seaports activity represent 50% of the international commercial flows of Morocco. Almost the entire Casablanca waterfront is under development, mainly the construction of huge entertainment centres between the port and Hassan II Mosque, the Anfa Resort project near the business, entertainment and living centre of Megarama, the shopping and entertainment complex of Morocco Mall, as well as a complete renovation of the coastal walkway. The Sindbad park is planned to be totally renewed with rides, games and entertainment services.

Royal Air Maroc has its head office at the Casablanca-Anfa Airport. In 2004, it announced that it was moving its head office from Casablanca to a location in Province of Nouaceur, close to Mohammed V International Airport. The agreement to build the head office in Nouaceur was signed in 2009.

The largest CBD both in Casablanca and the Maghreb is in Sidi Maarouf, near the Hassan II Mosque.

Administrative divisions 
Casablanca is a commune, part of the region of Casablanca-Settat. The commune is divided into eight districts or prefectures, which are themselves divided into 16 subdivisions or arrondissements and one municipality. The districts and their subdivisions are:

 Aïn Chock (عين الشق) – Aïn Chock (عين الشق)
 Aïn Sebaâ - Hay Mohammadi (عين السبع الحي المحمدي) – Aïn Sebaâ (عين السبع), Hay Mohammadi (الحي المحمدي), Roches Noires (روش نوار).
 Anfa (أنفا) – Anfa (أنفا), Maârif (المعاريف), Sidi Belyout (سيدي بليوط).
 Ben M'Sick (بن مسيك) – Ben M'Sick (بن مسيك), Sbata (سباته).
 Sidi Bernoussi (سيدي برنوصي) – Sidi Bernoussi (سيدي برنوصي), Sidi Moumen (سيدي مومن).
 Al Fida - Mers Sultan (الفداء – مرس السلطان) – Al Fida (الفداء); Mechouar (المشور) (municipality), Mers Sultan (مرس السلطان).
 Hay Hassani (الحي الحسني) – Hay Hassani (الحي الحسني).
 Moulay Rachid (مولاي رشيد) – Moulay Rachid (مولاي رشيد), Sidi Othmane (سيدي عثمان).

Neighborhoods 

The list of neighborhoods is indicative and not complete:

 2 Mars
 Ain Chock
 Ain Diab
 Ain Sebaa
 Attacharouk
 Belvédère
 Beauséjour
 Bouchentouf
 Bouskoura
 Bourgogne
 Californie
 Centre Ville
 C.I.L.
 La Colline
 Derb Ghallef
 Derb Sultan
 Derb Tazi
 Gauthier
 Ghandi
 Habous
 El Hank
 Hay Dakhla
 Hay El Baraka
 Hay El Hanaa
 Hay El Hassani
 Hay El Mohammadi
 Hay Farah
 Hay Moulay Rachid
 Hay Salama
 Hubous 
 Inara
 Laimoun (Hay Hassani)
 Lamkansa
 Lissasfa
 Maârif
 Mers Sultan
 Nassim
 Oasis
 Old Madina
 Oulfa
 Palmiers
 Polo
 Racine
 Riviera
 Roches Noires
 Salmia 2
 Sbata
 Sidi Bernoussi
 Sidi Maârouf
 Sidi Moumen
 Sidi Othmane

Demographics 

The commune of Casablanca recorded a population of 3,359,818 in the 2014 Moroccan census. About 98% live in urban areas. Around 25% of the population are under 15 years old, and 9% are over 60 years old. The population of the city is about 11% of the total population of Morocco. Grand Casablanca is also the largest urban area in the Maghreb. 99.9% of the population of Morocco are Arab and Berber Muslims. During the French protectorate in Morocco, European Christians formed almost half the population of Casablanca. Since Moroccan independence in 1956, the European population has decreased substantially. The city also is still home to a small community of Moroccan Christians, as well as a small group of foreign Roman Catholic and Protestant residents.

Judaism in Casablanca 

Jews have a long history in Casablanca. A Sephardic Jewish community was in Anfa up to the destruction of the city by the Portuguese in 1468. Jews were slow to return to the town, but by 1750, the Rabbi Elijah Synagogue was built as the first Jewish synagogue in Casablanca. It was destroyed along with much of the town in the 1755 Lisbon earthquake.

Approximately 28,000 Moroccan Jews immigrated to the State of Israel between 1948 and 1951, many through Casablanca. Casablanca then became a departure point in Operation Yachin, the covert Mossad-organized migration operation from 1961 to 1964. In 2018 it was estimated that there were only 2,500 Moroccan Jews living in Casablanca, while according to the World Jewish Congress there were only 1,000 Moroccan Jews remaining.

Today, the Jewish cemetery of Casablanca is one of the major cemeteries of the city, and many synagogues remain in service, but the city's Jewish community has dwindled. The Moroccan Jewish Museum is a museum established in the city in 1997.

Education

Colleges and universities 
Public: University of Hassan II Casablanca

Private:

Université Mundiapolis
Université Internationale de Casablanca

Primary and secondary schools 
International schools:

 Belgium: École Belge de Casablanca
 French:
Collège Anatole France
Lycée Lyautey
Groupe Scolaire Louis Massignon
Lycée La Résidence
Lycée Maïmonide (FR)
Lycée Léon l'Africain
École Normale Hébraïque
École Al Jabr
 Italian: Scuola "Enrico Mattei"
 Spanish: Instituto Español Juan Ramón Jiménez
 American:
Casablanca American School
American Academy Casablanca
George Washington Academy
Montessori:
Ecole Montessori Casablanca

Libraries 

 
 King Abdul Aziz Foundation for Human Sciences and Islamic Studies
 Dar America
 Institut Français
 Instituto Cervantes

Places of worship 
Most of the city's places of worship are Muslim mosques. Some of the city's synagogues, such as Ettedgui Synagogue, also remain. There are also Christian churches; some remain in use — particularly by the West African migrant community — while many of the churches built during the colonial period have been repurposed, such as Church of the Sacred Heart.

Sports

Association football 

Casablanca is home to two popular football clubs: Wydad Casablanca and Raja Casablanca—which are rivals. Raja's symbol is an eagle and Wydad's symbol is a star and crescent, a symbol of Islam. These two popular clubs have produced some of Morocco's best players, such as: Salaheddine Bassir, Abdelmajid Dolmy, Baddou Zaki, Aziz Bouderbala, and Noureddine Naybet. Other football teams on top of these two major teams based in the city of Casablanca include Rachad Bernoussi, TAS de Casablanca, Majd Al Madina, and Racing Casablanca. 

Raja CA, founded in 1949, compete in Botola and play their home games at the Stade Mohammed V. The club is known for their supporters and is one of the most supported teams in Africa. Wydad AC, founded in 1937, also compete in Botola and play their home games at the Stade Mohammed V. Both have a strong reputation on continental competitions, having both won the CAF Champions League three times.

Casablanca hosted eight African Champions League finals, all eight at the Stade Mohammed V. The Stade also hosted the 2018 CHAN Final (which Morocco won) and 1988 African Cup of Nations final.

Tennis 
Casablanca hosts The Grand Prix Hassan II, a professional men's tennis tournament of the ATP tour. It first began in 1986, and is played on clay courts type at Complexe Al Amal.

Notable winners of the Hassan II Grand-Prix are Thomas Muster in 1990, Hicham Arazi in 1997, Younes El Aynaoui in 2002, and Stanislas Wawrinka in 2010.

Hosting 
Casablanca staged the 1961 Pan Arab Games, the 1983 Mediterranean Games, and games during the 1988 Africa Cup of Nations. Morocco was scheduled to host the 2015 African Nations Cup, but decided to decline due to Ebola fears. Morocco was expelled and the tournament was held in Equatorial Guinea.

Venues 

Stade Larbi Zaouli
Stade Mohamed V
Stade Sidi Bernoussi
Complexe Al Amal de Casablanca

The Grand Stade de Casablanca is the proposed title of the planned football stadium to be built in the city. Once completed in 2025, it will be used mostly for football matches and will serve as the home of Raja Casablanca, Wydad Casablanca, and the Morocco national football team. The stadium was designed with a capacity of 93,000 spectators, making it one of the highest-capacity stadiums in Africa. Once completed, it will replace the Stade Mohamed V. The initial idea of the stadium was for the 2010 FIFA World Cup, for which Morocco lost their bid to South Africa. Nevertheless, the Moroccan government supported the decision to go ahead with the plans. It will be completed in 2025. The idea of the stadium was also for the 2026 FIFA World Cup, for which Morocco lost their bid to Canada, Mexico and United States. It is now hoping for the 2030 FIFA World Cup which Morocco is co-bidding with either African neighbors Tunisia and Algeria or two European nations Spain and Portugal.

Road Racing 
The city is host to the International Casablanca Marathon, a 26.2-mile road race that draws international competition. The race was founded in 2008 and is a member of the Association of International Marathons and Distance Races .

Culture

Music 
Haja El Hamdaouia, one of the most iconic figures in aita music, was born in Casablanca. Nass El Ghiwane, led by Larbi Batma, came out of Hay Mohammadi in Casablanca. Naima Samih of Derb Sultan gained prominence through the program Mawahib. Abdelhadi Belkhayat and Abdelwahab Doukkali are musicians specializing in traditional Moroccan Arabic popular music. Zina Daoudia, Abdelaziz Stati, Abdellah Daoudi, and Said Senhaji are notable Moroccan chaabi musicians.

Abdelakabir Faradjallah founded Attarazat Addahabia, a Moroccan funk band, in 1968. Fadoul, another funk band, formed in the 1970s.

Hoba Hoba Spirit also formed in Casablanca, and is still based there. Casablanca has a thriving hiphop scene, with artists such as El Grande Toto, Don Big, 7liwa, and Issam Harris.

Casablanca hosts numerous music festivals, such as Jazzablanca and L'Boulevard, as well as a museum dedicated to Andalusi music, Dar ul-Aala.

Literature 
Francesco Cavalli's L'Ormindo is a 17th century Venetian opera set between Anfa and Fes.

The French writer Antoine de Saint-Exupéry is associated with Casablanca.

Driss Chraïbi's novel The Simple Past takes place in Casablanca. Mohamed Zafzaf lived in Maarif while writing and teaching at a high school.

Lamalif, a radical leftist political and cultural magazine, was based in Casablanca.

Casablanca's International Book Fair is held at the fair grounds opposite Hassan II Mosque annually in February.

Theater 
Tayeb Saddiki, described as the father of Moroccan theater, grew up in Casablanca and made his career there. Hanane el-Fadili and Hassan El Fad are popular comedians from Casablanca. Gad Elmaleh is another comedian from Casablanca, though he has made his career abroad.

Visual art 
The École des Beaux-Arts of Casablanca was founded in 1919 by a French Orientalist painter named Édouard Brindeau de Jarny, who started his career teaching drawing at Lycée Lyautey. The Casablanca School—a Modernist art movement and collective including artists such as Farid Belkahia, Mohamed Melehi, and Mohammed Chabâa—developed out of the École des Beaux-Arts of Casablanca in the late 1960s.

The Academy of Traditional Arts, part of the Hassan II Mosque complex, was founded 31 October 2012.

L'Uzine is a community-based art and culture space in Casablanca.

Rebel Spirit published The Casablanca Guide a comic book about life in Casablanca.

Sbagha Bagha is a street art festival during which murals are created on the sides of apartment buildings.

Photography 
Postcard companies such as Léon & Lévy were active in Casablanca. Gabriel Veyre also worked and eventually died in Casablanca.

Marcelin Flandrin (1889-1957), a French military photographer, settled in Casablanca and recorded much of the early colonial period in Morocco with his photography. With his staged nude postcard photos taken in Casablanca's colonial brothel quarter, Flandrin was also responsible for disseminating the orientalist image of Moroccan women as sexual objects.

Casablanca has a thriving street photography scene. Yoriyas is prominent among photographers capturing the economic capital's street scenes, and has attracted international attention.

Film 

In the first half of the 20th century, Casablanca had many movie theaters, such as Cinema Rialto, Cinema Lynx and Cinema Vox—the largest in Africa at the time it was built.

The 1942 American film Casablanca is set in Casablanca and has had a lasting impact on the city's image, despite being filmed in the US. Salut Casa! was a propaganda film brandishing France's purported colonial triumph in its mission civilizatrice in the city.

Mostafa Derkaoui's revolutionary independent film About Some Meaningless Events (1974) took place in Casablanca. It was the main subject of Ali Essafi's documentary Before the Dying of the Light.

Love in Casablanca (1991), starring Abdelkarim Derqaoui and Muna Fettou, is one of the first Moroccan films to deal with Morocco's complex realities and depict life in Casablanca with verisimilitude. Nour-Eddine Lakhmari's Casanegra (2008) depicts the harsh realities of Casablanca's working classes. The films Ali Zaoua (2000), Horses of God (2012), and Razzia (2017) of Nabil Ayouch—a French director of Moroccan heritage—deal with street crime, terrorism, and social issues in Casablanca, respectively. The events in Meryem Benm'Barek-Aloïsi's 2018 film Sofia revolve around an illegitimate pregnancy in Casablanca. Ahmed El Maanouni, Hicham Lasri, and Said Naciri are also from Casablanca.

Architecture 

Casablanca's architecture and urban development are historically significant. The city is home to many notable buildings in a variety of styles, including traditional Moroccan architecture, various colonial architectural styles, Art Nouveau, Art Deco, Neo-Mauresque, Streamline Moderne, Modernism, Brutalism, and more. During the French Protectorate, the French government described Casablanca as a "laboratory of urbanism."

The work of the Groupe des Architectes Modernes Marocains (GAMMA) on public housing projects—such as Carrières Centrales in Hay Mohammadi—in a style described as vernacular modernism influenced modernist architecture around the world.

Casamémoire and MAMMA. are two organizations dedicated to the preservation and appreciation of the city's architectural heritage.

Transport

Rapid transit 

The Casablanca Tramway is the rapid transit tram system in Casablanca. As of 2019, the network consists of two lines covering , with 71 stops; further lines (T3 and T4) are under construction.

Since the 1970s, Casablanca had planned to build a metro system to offer some relief to the problems of traffic congestion and poor air quality. However, the city council voted to abandon the metro project in 2014 due to high costs, and decided to continue expanding the already operating tram system instead.

Air 

Casablanca's main airport is Mohammed V International Airport, Morocco's busiest airport. Regular domestic flights serve Marrakech, Rabat, Agadir, Oujda, Tangier, Al Hoceima, and Laayoune, as well as other cities.

Casablanca is well-served by international flights to Europe, especially French and Spanish airports, and has regular connections to North American, Middle Eastern and sub-Saharan African destinations. New York City, Montreal, Paris, Washington D.C., London and Dubai are important primary destinations.

The older, smaller Casablanca-Anfa Airport to the west of the city, served certain destinations including Damascus and Tunis, and was largely closed to international civilian traffic in 2006. It was eventually demolished to make way for construction of the "Casablanca Finance City", the new heart of the city of Casablanca. Casablanca Tit Mellil Airport is located in the nearby community of Tit Mellil.

Coach buses 
Compagnie de Transports au Maroc (CTM) offers private intercity coach buses on various lines run servicing most notable Moroccan towns, as well as a number of European cities. These run from the CTM Bus Station on Leo Africanus Street near the Central Market in downtown Casablanca. Supratours, an affiliate of ONCF, also offers coach bus service at a slightly lower cost, departing from a station on Wilad Zian Street. There is another bus station farther down on the same street called the Wilad Zian Bus Station; this station is the country's largest bus station, serving over 800 buses daily, catering more to Morocco's lower income population.

Taxis 

Registered taxis in Casablanca are coloured red and known as petits taxis (small taxis), or coloured white and known as grands taxis (big taxis). As is standard Moroccan practice, petits taxis, typically small-four door Dacia Logan, Peugeot 207, or similar cars, provide metered cab service in the central metropolitan areas. Grands taxis, generally older Mercedes-Benz sedans, provide shared mini-bus like service within the city on predefined routes, or shared intercity service. Grands taxis may also be hired for private service by the hour or day.

Trains 
Casablanca is served by three main railway stations run by the national rail service, the ONCF.

 is the main intercity station, from which trains run south to Marrakech or El Jadida and north to Mohammedia and Rabat, and then on either to Tangier or Meknes, Fes, Taza and Oujda/Nador. It also serves as the southern terminus of the Al-Boraq high speed line from Tangier. A dedicated airport shuttle service to Mohammed V International Airport also has its primary in-city stop at this station, for connections on to further destinations.

 serves primarily commuter trains such as the Train Navette Rapide (TNR or Aouita) operating on the Casablanca – Kenitra rail corridor, with some connecting trains running on to Gare de Casa-Voyageurs. The station provides a direct interchange between train and shipping services, and is located near several port-area hotels. It is the nearest station to the old town of Casablanca, and to the modern city centre, around the landmark Casablanca Twin Center. Casa-Port station is being rebuilt in a modern and enlarged configuration. During the construction, the station is still operational. From 2013, it will provide a close connection from the rail network to the city's new tram network.

Casa-Oasis was originally a suburban commuter station which was fully redesigned and rebuilt in the early 21st century, and officially reopened in 2005 as a primary city rail station. Owing to its new status, all southern intercity train services to and from Casa-Voyageurs now call at Casa-Oasis. ONCF stated in 2005 that the refurbishment and upgrading of Casa-Oasis to intercity standards was intended to relieve passenger congestion at Casa-Voyageurs station.

Tourism 
Although Mohammed V International Airport receives most international flights into Morocco, international tourism in Casablanca is not as developed as it is in cities  such as Fes and Marrakech.

The Hassan II Mosque, which is the second largest mosque in Africa and the seventh largest in the world, is the city's main tourist attraction. Visitors also come to see the city's rich architectural heritage.

Popular sites for national tourism include shopping centers such as Morocco Mall, Anfa Place, the Marina Shopping Center, and the Tachfine Center. Additional sites include the Corniche and the beach of Ain Diab, and parks such as the Arab League Park or the Sindibad theme park.

Notable people 

Lahcen Abrami - Former footballer 
Amine Atouchi - Moroccan footballer
Khalil Azmi - Former Moroccan goalkeeper 
 Amal Ayouch (born 1966) – stage and film actress
 Wissam Baraka – Moroccan footballer
 Salaheddine Bassir – Moroccan footballer
 Laarbi Batma – Moroccan musician and artist, founding member of Nas El Ghiwan
 Larbi Benbarek – Moroccan footballer
Badr Benoun - Moroccan footballer
 Miriem Bensalah-Chaqroun – Moroccan businesswoman
 Jean-Paul Bertrand-Demanes – French footballer
 Frida Boccara – French singer, Winner of the Eurovision Song Contest 1969
 Aziz Bouderbala - Former Moroccan footballer 
 Merieme Chadid – Moroccan astronomer
Mustapha Chadili - Former goalkeeper 
Achraf Dari – Moroccan footballer
 Jean-Charles de Castelbajac – French fashion designer
 Nabil Dirar – Moroccan footballer
Abdelmajid Dolmy - Former Moroccan footballer 
 Dizzy DROS – Moroccan rapper
Issam El Adoua - Moroccan footballer
Badr El Kaddouri - Former Moroccan footballer 
Talal El Karkouri - Former Moroccan footballer 
 Gad Elmaleh – French/Canadian comedian
 Bouchaib El Moubarki - Former Moroccan footballer 
 Youssef Fertout - Moroccan manager
 La Fouine – Moroccan-French rapper
Khalid Fouhami - Former gmoroccan oalkeeper 
Mohamed Fouzair - Moroccan footballer
 Divina Frau-Meigs – sociologist and professor
 El Haqed – Moroccan rapper
 Serge Haroche – French physicist who was awarded the 2012 Nobel Prize for Physics
 Shatha Hassoun – Moroccan/Iraqi singer
 Lydia Hatuel-Czuckermann – Israeli Olympic fencer
 Mouhcine Iajour - Moroccan footballer 
 Nadir Lamyaghri - Former Moroccan goalkeeper 
Hamza Mendyl – Moroccan footballer
 Hicham Mesbahi – Moroccan boxer
 French Montana – American rapper
 Nawal El Moutawakel – Olympic champion
 Hakim Mouzaki - Moroccan footballer
 Abderrahim Najah - International Basketball player
 Noureddine Naybet – Moroccan footballer
 Mostafa Nissaboury – Moroccan poet
 Hakim Noury – Moroccan film director
 Maurice Ohana – French composer
 Faouzia Ouihya – Moroccan-Canadian singer
 Jean Reno – French Hollywood actor
 Youssef Rossi - Former Moroccan footballer 
 Abdelilah Saber - Former footballer 
 Youssef Safri - Moroccan football manager
 Jamal Sellami - Moroccan football manager
 Daniel Sivan – professor
 Alain Souchon – French songwriter
 Frank Stephenson – award-winning automobile designer
 Hassan Saada – Moroccan boxer arrested for alleged rape before Olympic match
 Sidney Taurel – naturalized American CEO of Eli Lilly and Company from 1998 to 2008
 Richard Virenque – French cyclist
 Muhammad Zarqtuni – Moroccan nationalist and resistance leader
 Abdallah Zrika – Moroccan poet
Soufiane Choubani – Founder of the Moroccan National Debate Team

In popular culture 

 The 1942 film Casablanca (starring Ingrid Bergman and Humphrey Bogart) is supposed to have been set in Casablanca, although it was filmed entirely in Los Angeles and doesn't feature a single Arab or North African character with a speaking role. The film depicts Casablanca as the scene of power struggle between various foreign powers, which had much more to do with the Tangier of the time. The film has achieved worldwide popularity since its release. Nominated for eight Academy Awards, it won three, including Best Picture.
A Night in Casablanca (1946) was the 12th Marx Brothers' movie. The film stars Groucho Marx, Chico Marx, and Harpo Marx. It was directed by Archie Mayo and written by Joseph Fields and Roland Kibbee. The film contains the song "Who's Sorry Now?", with music by Ted Snyder and lyrics by Bert Kalmar and Harry Ruby. It is sung in French by Lisette Verea playing the part of Beatrice Rheiner, and then later sung in English. Liszt's "Hungarian Rhapsody No. 2" is played twice, once by Chico on piano as an introduction to the "Beer Barrel Polka", and again by Harpo on the harp.
 The city is featured in The Mysterious Caravan (1975), volume 54 in the original Hardy Boys series.
 Casablanca is the setting for several chapters in Doubleshot, a 2000 James Bond novel by Raymond Benson. In the novel, one of the characters mentions that the 1942 film was shot in Hollywood and not on location.
 Casablanca is one of the key locations in the 2006 video game Dreamfall, as it is where the primary protagonist of the game, Zoë Castillo, lives. Although the city is imagined in the year 2219, much of the present-day architecture is used for inspiration.
 Casablanca is the setting for the first act of the 2016 World War II romantic thriller film Allied starring Brad Pitt and Marion Cotillard.

Twin towns – sister cities

Casablanca is twinned with:

 Bordeaux, France
 Busan, South Korea
 Chicago, United States
 Dakar, Senegal
 Dubai, United Arab Emirates
 Jakarta, Indonesia
 Kuala Lumpur, Malaysia
 Muscat, Oman
 Nouadhibou, Mauritania
 Shanghai, China

Casablanca also has cooperation agreements with:

 Abuja, Nigeria
 Amman, Jordan
 Amsterdam, Netherlands
 Barcelona, Spain
 Buenos Aires, Argentina
 Hebron, Palestine
 Istanbul, Turkey
 Kajiado, Kenya
 Koudougou, Burkina Faso
 Montreal, Canada
 Moroni, Comoros
 Nouakchott, Mauritania
 Paris, France
 Ramallah, Palestine
 Rotterdam, Netherlands

See also 
 Royal Palace of Casablanca
 Rabat Zoo

References

External links 

 Official web site of Casablanca
 Official Casablanca Tourism Website 
 Casablanca photo gallery (buildings and other landmarks with a history dating back to the French Protectorate)
 Open Air Museum of 20th century architecture
 

 
Prefecturial capitals in Morocco
Regional capitals in Morocco
Municipalities of Morocco
Populated places established in the 7th century BC